Pleurothyrium is a genus of flowering plants in the family Lauraceae. Many of the species were first described in a 1993 revision of the genus.

Species include:
Pleurothyrium amapaense
Pleurothyrium amplifolium
Pleurothyrium bifidum
Pleurothyrium cinereum
Pleurothyrium costanense
Pleurothyrium cuneifolium
 Pleurothyrium giganthum van der Werff
Pleurothyrium glabrifolium
Pleurothyrium glabritepalum
Pleurothyrium golfodulcense
Pleurothyrium guindonii
 Pleurothyrium hexaglandulosum van der Werff
Pleurothyrium immersum
Pleurothyrium insigne
Pleurothyrium intermedium
Pleurothyrium maximum
Pleurothyrium nobile
Pleurothyrium oblongum
 Pleurothyrium obovatum van der Werff
Pleurothyrium palmanum
Pleurothyrium panurense
Pleurothyrium parviflorum
Pleurothyrium pauciflorum
Pleurothyrium pilosum
Pleurothyrium poeppigii
Pleurothyrium racemosum
 Pleurothyrium roberto-andinoi C. Nelson
Pleurothyrium steyermarkianum
Pleurothyrium synandrum
Pleurothyrium tomentellum
Pleurothyrium tomiwahlii
Pleurothyrium trianae
Pleurothyrium undulatum
Pleurothyrium vasquezii
Pleurothyrium westphalii
Pleurothyrium williamsii

References

Lauraceae genera
Taxonomy articles created by Polbot
Neotropical realm flora
Lauraceae